Memorial Bridge spans the St. Johns River and connects Palatka to East Palatka, Florida. The bridge is the only permanent vehicle crossing between Green Cove Springs and Astor. As such, the bridge is an important part of connecting the region. Both US 17 and SR 100 use the bridge as a river crossing.

The first bridge spanning this portion of river was constructed by the Palatka Bridge Company in 1888 and was built for rail operated vehicles. The first concrete bridge was completed in 1927 and carried two lanes of vehicular traffic. The former draw bridge was built to honor the military personnel of Putnam County. Four bronze military service men statues proudly watched over the bridge, with two standing guard at each side. Today, the span continues to commemorate the men and women of Putnam County serving in the military. The Doughboy statues can still be seen at the foot of the current bridge.

Completed in 1976, the four lane bridge is 4,020 ft long and has a vertical clearance of 65 ft. Public parks lie at both ends of the bridge; Goodwin Riverfront Park is on the west end in Palatka, and Veterans Memorial Park is on the east end in East Palatka.

See also

References

Bridges completed in 1927
Bridges completed in 1976
U.S. Route 17
Road bridges in Florida
Bridges over the St. Johns River
Bridges of the United States Numbered Highway System
1976 establishments in Florida
1927 establishments in Florida
Concrete bridges in the United States
Box girder bridges in the United States
Transportation buildings and structures in Putnam County, Florida